Tiago Nuno Cordeiro Borges (born 6 June 1985 in Praia (Santa Cruz da Graciosa), Azores) is a Portuguese footballer who plays for Anadia F.C. as a forward.

References

External links

1985 births
Living people
Portuguese footballers
Association football forwards
Liga Portugal 2 players
Segunda Divisão players
FC Porto B players
F.C. Marco players
Anadia F.C. players
Leixões S.C. players
AD Fafe players
Moreirense F.C. players
Académico de Viseu F.C. players
S.C. Salgueiros players
A.D. Sanjoanense players
Portugal youth international footballers